

Events

Pre-1600
1096 – Count Emicho enters Mainz, where his followers massacre Jewish citizens. At least 600 Jews are killed.
1120 – Richard III of Capua is anointed as Prince two weeks before his untimely death.
1153 – Malcolm IV becomes King of Scotland.
1199 – John is crowned King of England.
1257 – Richard of Cornwall, and his wife, Sanchia of Provence, are crowned King and Queen of the Germans at Aachen Cathedral.

1601–1900
1644 – Manchu regent Dorgon defeats rebel leader Li Zicheng of the Shun dynasty at the Battle of Shanhai Pass, allowing the Manchus to enter and conquer the capital city of Beijing.
1703 – Tsar Peter the Great founds the city of Saint Petersburg.
1798 – The Battle of Oulart Hill takes place in Wexford, Ireland; Irish rebel leaders defeat and kill a detachment of militia.
1799 – War of the Second Coalition: Austrian forces defeat the French at Winterthur, Switzerland.
1813 – War of 1812: In Canada, American forces capture Fort George.
1860 – Giuseppe Garibaldi begins his attack on Palermo, Sicily, as part of the Italian unification.
1863 – American Civil War: First Assault on the Confederate works at the Siege of Port Hudson.
1874 – The first group of Dorsland trekkers under the leadership of Gert Alberts leaves Pretoria.
1883 – Alexander III is crowned Tsar of Russia.
1896 – The F4-strength St. Louis–East St. Louis tornado hits in St. Louis, Missouri, and East St. Louis, Illinois, killing at least 255 people and causing over $10 million in damage.

1901–present
1905 – Russo-Japanese War: The Battle of Tsushima begins.
1915 – HMS Princess Irene explodes and sinks off Sheerness, Kent, with the loss of 352 lives.
1917 – Pope Benedict XV promulgates the 1917 Code of Canon Law, the first comprehensive codification of Catholic canon law in the legal history of the Catholic Church.
1919 – The NC-4 aircraft arrives in Lisbon after completing the first transatlantic flight.
1927 – The Ford Motor Company ceases manufacture of the Ford Model T and begins to retool plants to make the Ford Model A.
1930 – The  Chrysler Building in New York City, the tallest man-made structure at the time, opens to the public.
1933 – New Deal: The U.S. Federal Securities Act is signed into law requiring the registration of securities with the Federal Trade Commission.
1935 – New Deal: The Supreme Court of the United States declares the National Industrial Recovery Act to be unconstitutional in A.L.A. Schechter Poultry Corp. v. United States, (295 U.S. 495).
1937 – In California, the Golden Gate Bridge opens to pedestrian traffic, creating a vital link between San Francisco and Marin County, California.
1940 – World War II: In the Le Paradis massacre, 99 soldiers from a Royal Norfolk Regiment unit are shot after surrendering to German troops; two survive.
1941 – World War II: U.S. President Franklin D. Roosevelt proclaims an "unlimited national emergency".
  1941   – World War II: The  is sunk in the North Atlantic, killing almost 2,100 men.
1942 – World War II: In Operation Anthropoid, Reinhard Heydrich is fatally wounded in Prague; he dies of his injuries eight days later.
1950 – The Linnanmäki amusement park is opened for the first time in Helsinki.
1958 – First flight of the McDonnell Douglas F-4 Phantom II.
1960 – In Turkey, a military coup removes President Celâl Bayar and the rest of the democratic government from office.
1962 – The Centralia mine fire is ignited in the town's landfill above a coal mine.
1965 – Vietnam War: American warships begin the first bombardment of National Liberation Front targets within South Vietnam.
1967 – Australians vote in favor of a constitutional referendum granting the Australian government the power to make laws to benefit Indigenous Australians and to count them in the national census.
  1967   – The U.S. Navy aircraft carrier  is launched by Jacqueline Kennedy and her daughter Caroline.
1971 – The Dahlerau train disaster, the worst railway accident in West Germany, kills 46 people and injures 25 near Wuppertal.
1977 – A plane crash at José Martí International Airport in Havana, Cuba, kills 67.
  1971   – Pakistani forces massacre over 200 civilians, mostly Bengali Hindus, in the Bagbati massacre.
1975 – Dibbles Bridge coach crash near Grassington, in North Yorkshire, England, kills 33 – the highest ever death toll in a road accident in the United Kingdom.
1980 – The Gwangju Massacre: Airborne and army troops of South Korea retake the city of Gwangju from civil militias, killing at least 207 and possibly many more.
1984 – The Danube–Black Sea Canal is opened, in a ceremony attended by the Ceaușescus. It had been under construction since the 1950s.
1988 – Somaliland War of Independence: Somali National Movement launches a major offensive against Somali government forces in Hargeisa and Burao, then second and third largest cities of Somalia.
1996 – First Chechen War: Russian President Boris Yeltsin meets with Chechnyan rebels for the first time and negotiates a cease-fire.
1997 – The 1997 Central Texas tornado outbreak occurs, spawning multiple tornadoes in Central Texas, including the F5 that killed 27 in Jarrell.
1998 – Oklahoma City bombing: Michael Fortier is sentenced to 12 years in prison and fined $200,000 for failing to warn authorities about the terrorist plot.
2001 – Members of the Islamist separatist group Abu Sayyaf seize twenty hostages from an affluent island resort on Palawan in the Philippines; the hostage crisis would not be resolved until June 2002.
2006 – The 6.4  Yogyakarta earthquake shakes central Java with an MSK intensity of VIII (Damaging), leaving more than 5,700 dead and 37,000 injured.
2016 – Barack Obama is the first president of United States to visit Hiroshima Peace Memorial Park and meet Hibakusha.
2017 – Andrew Scheer takes over after Rona Ambrose as the leader of the Conservative Party of Canada.
2018 – Maryland Flood Event: A flood occurs throughout the Patapsco Valley, causing one death, destroying the entire first floors of buildings on Main Street in Ellicott City, and causing cars to overturn.

Births

Pre-1600
 742 – Emperor Dezong of Tang (d. 805)
1332 – Ibn Khaldun, Tunisian historian and theologian (d. 1406)
1378 – Zhu Quan, Chinese military commander, historian and playwright (d. 1448)
1519 – Girolamo Mei, Italian historian and theorist (d. 1594)
1537 – Louis IV, Landgrave of Hesse-Marburg (d. 1604)
1576 – Caspar Schoppe, German author and scholar (d. 1649)
1584 – Michael Altenburg, German theologian and composer (d. 1640)

1601–1900
1601 – Antoine Daniel, French-Canadian missionary and saint (d. 1648)
1626 – William II, Prince of Orange (d. 1650)
1651 – Louis Antoine de Noailles, French cardinal (d. 1729)
1652 – Elizabeth Charlotte, Princess Palatine of Germany (d. 1722)
1738 – Nathaniel Gorham, American merchant and politician, 14th President of the Continental Congress (d. 1796)
1756 – Maximilian I Joseph of Bavaria (d. 1825) 
1774 – Francis Beaufort, Irish hydrographer and officer in the Royal Navy (d. 1857)
1794 – Cornelius Vanderbilt, American businessman and philanthropist (d. 1877)
1814 – John Rudolph Niernsee, Viennese-born American architect (d.1885)
1815 – Henry Parkes, English-Australian politician, 7th Premier of New South Wales (d. 1896) 
1818 – Amelia Bloomer, American journalist and activist (d. 1894)
1819 – Julia Ward Howe, American poet and songwriter (d. 1910)
1827 – Samuel F. Miller, American lawyer and politician (d. 1892)
1832 – Zenas Ferry Moody, American surveyor and politician, 7th Governor of Oregon (d. 1917)
1836 – Jay Gould, American businessman and financier (d. 1892)
1837 – Wild Bill Hickok, American police officer (d. 1876)
1852 – Billy Barnes, English cricketer (d. 1899)
1857 – Theodor Curtius, German chemist (d. 1928)
1860 – Manuel Teixeira Gomes, Portuguese politician, 7th President of Portugal (d. 1941)
1863 – Arthur Mold, English cricketer (d. 1921)
1867 – Arnold Bennett, English author and playwright (d. 1931)
1868 – Aleksa Šantić, Bosnian poet and author (d. 1924)
1871 – Georges Rouault, French painter and illustrator (d. 1958)
1875 – Frederick Cuming, English cricketer (d. 1942)
1876 – Ferdynand Antoni Ossendowski, Polish journalist and author (d. 1945)
  1876   – William Stanier, English engineer (d. 1965)
1878 – Anna Cervin, Swedish artist (d. 1972)
1879 – Karl Bühler, German-American linguist and psychologist (d. 1963)
  1879   – Hans Lammers, German judge and politician (d. 1962)
1883 – Jessie Arms Botke, American painter (d. 1971)
1884 – Max Brod, Czech journalist, author, and composer (d. 1968)
1887 – Frank Woolley, English cricketer (d. 1978)
1888 – Louis Durey, French composer (d. 1979)
1891 – Claude Champagne, Canadian violinist, pianist, and composer (d. 1965)
  1891   – Jaan Kärner, Estonian poet and author (d. 1958)
1894 – Louis-Ferdinand Céline, French physician and author (d. 1961)
  1894   – Dashiell Hammett, American detective novelist and screenwriter  (d. 1961)
1895 – Douglas Lloyd Campbell, Canadian educator and politician, 13th Premier of Manitoba (d. 1995)
1897 – John Cockcroft, English physicist and academic, Nobel Prize laureate (d. 1967)
  1897   – Dink Templeton, American rugby player and coach (d. 1962)
1898 – David Crosthwait, American engineer, inventor and writer (d. 1976)
1899 – Johannes Türn, Estonian chess and draughts player (d. 1993)
1900 – Lotte Toberentz, German overseer of the Nazi Uckermark concentration camp (d. 1964)
  1900   – Uładzimir Žyłka, Belarusian poet and translator (d. 1933)

1901–present
1906 – Buddhadasa, Thai monk and philosopher (d. 1993)
  1906   – Harry Hibbs, English footballer (d. 1984)
  1906   – Antonio Rosario Mennonna, Italian bishop (d. 2009)
1907 – Nicolas Calas, Greek-American poet and critic (d. 1988)
  1907   – Rachel Carson, American biologist, environmentalist, and author (d. 1964)
1909 – Dolores Hope, American singer and philanthropist  (d. 2011)
1911 – Hubert Humphrey, American journalist and politician, 38th Vice President of the United States (d. 1978)
  1911   – Teddy Kollek, Hungarian-Israeli politician, Mayor of Jerusalem (d. 2007)
  1911   – Vincent Price, American actor (d. 1993)
1912 – John Cheever, American novelist and short story writer (d. 1982)
  1912   – Sam Snead, American golfer and sportscaster (d. 2002)
  1912   – Terry Moore, American baseball player, coach, and manager (d. 1995)
1915 – Ester Soré, Chilean singer-songwriter (d. 1996)
  1915   – Herman Wouk, American novelist (d. 2019)
1917 – Harry Webster, English engineer (d. 2007)
1918 – Yasuhiro Nakasone, Japanese commander and politician, 45th Prime Minister of Japan (d. 2019)
1921 – Bob Godfrey, Australian-English animator, director, and voice actor (d. 2013)
1922 – Otto Carius, German lieutenant and pharmacist (d. 2015)
  1922   – Christopher Lee, English actor (d. 2015)
  1922   – John D. Vanderhoof, American banker and politician, 37th Governor of Colorado (d. 2013)
1923 – Henry Kissinger, German-American political scientist and politician, 56th United States Secretary of State, Nobel Prize laureate
  1923   – Sumner Redstone, American businessman and philanthropist (d. 2020)
1924 – Jaime Lusinchi, Venezuelan physician and politician, President of Venezuela (d. 2014)
  1924   – John Sumner, English-Australian director, founded the Melbourne Theatre Company (d. 2013)
1925 – Tony Hillerman, American journalist and author (d. 2008)
1927 – Jüri Randviir, Estonian chess player and journalist (d. 1996)
1928 – Thea Musgrave, Scottish-American composer and educator
1930 – John Barth, American novelist and short story writer
  1930   – William S. Sessions, American civil servant and judge, 8th Director of the Federal Bureau of Investigation (d. 2020)
  1930   – Eino Tamberg, Estonian composer and educator (d. 2010)
1931 – André Barbeau, French-Canadian neurologist (d. 1986)
  1931   – John Chapple, English field marshal and politician, Governor of Gibraltar
  1931   – Bernard Fresson, French actor (d. 2002)
  1931   – Faten Hamama, Egyptian actress and producer (d. 2015)
  1931   – Philip Kotler, American author and professor
1933 – Edward Samuel Rogers, Canadian businessman (d. 2008)
  1933   – Manfred Sommer, Spanish author and illustrator (d. 2007)
1934 – Ray Daviault, Canadian-American baseball player (d. 2020)
  1934   – Harlan Ellison, American author and screenwriter (d. 2018)
1935 – Daniel Colchico, American football player and coach (d. 2014)
  1935   – Mal Evans, British road manager of The Beatles (d. 1976)
  1935   – Jerry Kindall, American baseball player and coach (d. 2017)
  1935   – Ramsey Lewis, American jazz pianist and composer (d. 2022)
  1935   – Lee Meriwether, American model and actress, Miss America 1955 
1936 – Benjamin Bathurst, English admiral
  1936   – Louis Gossett Jr., American actor and producer
  1936   – Marcel Masse, Canadian educator and politician, 29th Canadian Minister of National Defence (d. 2014)
1937 – Allan Carr, American playwright and producer (d. 1999)
1939 – Simon Cairns, 6th Earl Cairns, English courtier and businessman
  1939   – Yves Duhaime, Canadian captain and politician
  1939   – Sokratis Kokkalis, Greek businessman
  1939   – Gerald Ronson, English businessman and philanthropist
  1939   – Lionel Sosa, Mexican-American advertising and marketing executive 
  1939   – Don Williams, American singer-songwriter and guitarist (d. 2017) 
1940 – Mike Gibson, Australian journalist and sportscaster (d. 2015)
1942 – Lee Baca, American police officer
  1942   – Piers Courage, English racing driver (d. 1970)
  1942   – Roger Freeman, Baron Freeman, English accountant and politician, Chancellor of the Duchy of Lancaster
  1942   – Robin Widdows, English racing driver
1943 – Cilla Black, English singer and actress (d. 2015)
  1943   – Bruce Weitz, American actor
1944 – Christopher Dodd, American lawyer and politician
  1944   – Ingrid Roscoe, English historian and politician, Lord Lieutenant of West Yorkshire (d. 2020)
  1944   – Alain Souchon, French singer-songwriter, guitarist, and actor
1945 – Bruce Cockburn, Canadian singer-songwriter and guitarist 
1946 – Niels-Henning Ørsted Pedersen, Danish bassist and composer (d. 2005)
  1946   – John Williams, English motorcycle racer (d. 1978)
1947 – Peter DeFazio, American politician
  1947   – Marty Kristian, German-Australian singer-songwriter, guitarist, and actor 
  1947   – Branko Oblak, Slovenian footballer and coach
  1947   – Riivo Sinijärv, Estonian politician, 19th Estonian Minister of Foreign Affairs
1948 – Wubbo de Boer, Dutch civil servant (d. 2017)
  1948   – Pete Sears, English bass player 
  1948   – Morning Glory Zell-Ravenheart, American occultist and author (d. 2014)
1949 – Hugh Lowther, 8th Earl of Lonsdale, English politician
  1949   – Christa Vahlensieck, German runner
1950 – Dee Dee Bridgewater, American singer-songwriter and actress 
  1950   – Makis Dendrinos, Greek basketball player and coach (d. 2015)
1951 – John Conteh, English boxer
1954 – Pauline Hanson, Australian businesswoman, activist, and politician
  1954   – Jackie Slater, American football player and coach
1955 – Eric Bischoff, American wrestler, manager, and producer
  1955   – Richard Schiff, American actor, director, and producer
  1955   – Ian Tracey, English organist and conductor
1956 – Cynthia McFadden, American journalist
  1956   – Rosemary Squire, English producer and manager, co-founded Ambassador Theatre Group
  1956   – Giuseppe Tornatore, Italian director and screenwriter
1957 – Dag Terje Andersen, Norwegian politician, Norwegian Minister of Labour
  1957   – Nitin Gadkari, Indian lawyer and politician, Indian Minister of Transport
  1957   – Eddie Harsch, Canadian-American keyboard player and bass player (d. 2016)
  1957   – Siouxsie Sioux, English singer-songwriter, musician, and producer
1958 – Nick Anstee, English accountant and politician, 682nd Lord Mayor of London
  1958   – Neil Finn, New Zealand singer-songwriter and musician
  1958   – Jesse Robredo, Filipino politician, 23rd Secretary of the Interior and Local Government (d. 2012)
1960 – Gaston Therrien, Canadian ice hockey player and sportscaster
1961 – José Luíz Barbosa, Brazilian runner and coach
  1961   – Peri Gilpin, American actress
1962 – Marcelino Bernal, Mexican footballer 
  1962   – Ray Borner, Australian basketball player
  1962   – Steven Brill, American actor, director, producer, and screenwriter
  1962   – Anthony A. Hyman, Israeli-English biologist and academic
  1962   – David Mundell, Scottish lawyer and politician, Secretary of State for Scotland
  1962   – Ravi Shastri, Indian cricketer and sportscaster
1963 – Gonzalo Rubalcaba, Cuban pianist and composer
  1963   – Maria Walliser, Swiss skier
1964 – Adam Carolla, American actor, producer, and screenwriter
1965 – Pat Cash, Australian-English tennis player and sportscaster
1966 – Heston Blumenthal, English chef and author
1967 – Paul Gascoigne, English international footballer, coach, and manager
  1967   – Eddie McClintock, American actor
1968 – Jeff Bagwell, American baseball player and coach
  1968   – Rebekah Brooks, English journalist 
  1968   – Harun Erdenay, Turkish basketball player and coach
  1968   – Frank Thomas, American baseball player and sportscaster
1969 – Todd Hundley, American baseball player
  1969   – Jeremy Mayfield, American race car driver
  1969   – Craig Federighi, American computer scientist and engineer 
1970 – Michele Bartoli, Italian cyclist
  1970   – Tim Farron, English educator and politician
  1970   – Joseph Fiennes, English actor
  1970   – Alex Archer, American-born Australian musician
1971 – Mathew Batsiua, Nauruan politician
  1971   – Paul Bettany, English actor
  1971   – Wayne Carey, Australian footballer and coach
  1971   – Kaur Kender, Estonian author
  1971   – Lisa Lopes, American rapper and dancer (d. 2002)
  1971   – Lee Sharpe, English footballer
  1971   – Grant Stafford, South African tennis player
  1971   – Sophie Walker, British politician, leader of the Women's Equality Party
  1971   – Petroc Trelawny, British radio and television broadcaster
1972 – Todd Demsey, American golfer
  1972   – Antonio Freeman, American football player
  1972   – Maxim Sokolov, Russian ice hockey player
1973 – Jack McBrayer, American actor and comedian
  1973   – Tana Umaga, New Zealand rugby player and coach
  1973   – Yorgos Lanthimos, Greek film video, and theatre director, producer and screenwriter
1974 – Skye Edwards, British singer-songwriter 
  1974   – Denise van Outen, English actress, singer, and television host
  1974   – Derek Webb, American singer-songwriter and guitarist 
  1974   – Danny Wuerffel, American football player
1975 – André 3000, American rapper
  1975   – Michael Hussey, Australian cricketer
  1975   – Jamie Oliver, English chef and author
  1975   – Feryal Özel, Turkish astrophysicist, astronomer, and academic
1976 – Marcel Fässler, Swiss racing driver
1977 – Abderrahmane Hammad, Algerian high jumper
  1977   – Mahela Jayawardene, Sri Lankan cricketer
1978 – Adin Brown, American soccer player
1979 – Michael Buonauro, American author and illustrator (d. 2004)
  1979   – Mile Sterjovski, Australian footballer
1980 – Craig Buntin, Canadian figure skater
1981 – Alina Cojocaru, Romanian ballerina
  1981   – Johan Elmander, Swedish footballer
1982 – Natalya, Canadian professional wrestler
1984 – Blake Ahearn, American basketball player
  1984   – Miguel González, Mexican baseball pitcher
1985 – Chiang Chien-ming, Taiwanese baseball player
  1985   – Roberto Soldado, Spanish footballer
1986 – Conor Cummins, Manx motorcycle racer
  1986   – Bamba Fall, Senegalese basketball player
  1986   – Lasse Schöne, Danish footballer
1987 – Gervinho, Ivorian footballer
  1987   – Bella Heathcote, Australian actress
  1987   – Bora Paçun, Turkish basketball player
  1987   – Matt Prior, Australian rugby league player
  1987   – Martina Sáblíková, Czech speed skater and cyclist
1988 – Vontae Davis, American football player
  1988   – Irina Davydova, Russian hurdler
  1988   – Garrett Richards, American baseball pitcher
  1988   – Tyler Sash, American football player (d. 2015)
1989 – Igor Morozov, Estonian footballer
 1989    – Peakboy, South Korean rapper, record producer, and singer-songwriter
1990 – Yenew Alamirew, Ethiopian runner
  1990   – Chris Colfer, American actor and singer
  1990   – Marcus Kruger, Swedish ice hockey player
1991 – Sebastien Dewaest, Belgian footballer
  1991   – Tim Lafai, Samoan rugby league player
  1991   – Ksenia Pervak, Russian tennis player
  1991   – Eneli Vals, Estonian footballer
1992 – Aaron Brown, Canadian sprinter
  1992   – Laurence Vincent-Lapointe, Canadian canoer
1997 – Anna Bondar, Hungarian tennis player

Deaths

Pre-1600
 366 – Procopius, Roman usurper (b. 325)
 398 – Murong Bao, emperor of the Xianbei state Later Yan (b. 355)
 475 – Eutropius, bishop of Orange 
 866 – Ordoño I of Asturias (b. 831)
 927 – Simeon I of Bulgaria first Bulgarian  Emperor (b. 864)
1039 – Dirk III, Count of Holland (b. 981)
1045 – Bruno of Würzburg, imperial chancellor of Italy (b. c. 1005)
1178 – Godfrey van Rhenen, bishop of Utrecht
1240 – William de Warenne, 5th Earl of Surrey (b. 1166)
1444 – John Beaufort, 1st Duke of Somerset, English commander (b. 1404)
1508 – Ludovico Sforza, Duke of Milan (b. 1452)
1525 – Thomas Müntzer, German mystic and theologian (b. 1488)
1541 – Margaret Pole, Countess of Salisbury (b. 1473)
1564 – John Calvin, French pastor and theologian (b. 1509)

1601–1900
1610 – François Ravaillac, French assassin of Henry IV of France (b. 1578)
1624 – Diego Ramírez de Arellano, Spanish sailor and cosmographer (b. c. 1580)
1637 – John Boteler, 1st Baron Boteler of Brantfield, English politician (b. c. 1566)
1661 – Archibald Campbell, 1st Marquess of Argyll, Scottish general and politician (b. 1607)
1675 – Gaspard Dughet, Italian-French painter (b. 1613)
1690 – Giovanni Legrenzi, Italian organist and composer (b. 1626)
1702 – Dominique Bouhours, French priest and critic (b. 1628)
1707 – Françoise-Athénaïs, marquise de Montespan, French mistress of Louis XIV of France (b. 1640)
1781 – Giovanni Battista Beccaria, Italian physicist and academic (b. 1716)
1797 – François-Noël Babeuf, French journalist (b. 1760)
1831 – Jedediah Smith, American hunter, explorer, and author (b. 1799)
1840 – Niccolò Paganini, Italian violinist and composer (b. 1782)
1867 – Thomas Bulfinch American mythologist (b. 1796)
1896 – Aleksandr Stoletov, Russian physicist, engineer, and academic (b. 1839)

1901–present
1910 – Robert Koch, German physician and microbiologist, Nobel Prize laureate (b. 1843)
1918 – Ōzutsu Man'emon, Japanese sumo wrestler, the 18th Yokozuna (b. 1869)
1919 – Kandukuri Veeresalingam, Indian author and activist (b. 1848)
1933 – Achille Paroche, French target shooter (b. 1868)
1939 – Joseph Roth, Austrian-French journalist and author (b. 1894)
1941 – Ernst Lindemann, German captain (b. 1894)
  1941   – Günther Lütjens, German admiral (b. 1889)
1942 – Muhammed Hamdi Yazır, Turkish theologian, logician, and translator (b. 1878)
1943 – Gordon Coates, New Zealand soldier and politician, 21st Prime Minister of New Zealand (b. 1878)
1945 – Enno Lolling, German physician  (b. 1888)
1947 – Ed Konetchy, American baseball player and manager (b. 1885)
1949 – Robert Ripley, American cartoonist, publisher, and businessman, founded Ripley's Believe It or Not! (b. 1890)
1953 – Jesse Burkett, American baseball player and manager (b. 1868)
1960 – James Montgomery Flagg, American painter and illustrator (b. 1877)
1963 – Grigoris Lambrakis, Greek physician and politician (b. 1912)
1964 – Jawaharlal Nehru, Indian lawyer and politician, 1st Prime Minister of India (b. 1889)
1965 – John Rinehart Blue, American military officer, educator, businessperson, and politician (b. 1905)
1967 – W. Otto Miessner, American composer and educator (b. 1880)
  1967   – Ernst Niekisch, German academic and politician (b. 1889)
1969 – Jeffrey Hunter, American actor and producer (b. 1926)
1971 – Béla Juhos, Hungarian-Austrian philosopher from the Vienna Circle (b. 1901)
  1971   – Armando Picchi, Italian footballer and coach (b. 1935)
1980 – Gün Sazak, Turkish agronomist and politician (b. 1932)
1984 – Vasilije Mokranjac, Serbian composer (b. 1923)
  1984   – Eric Morecambe, Comedian, actor, entertainer and singer (b. 1926)
1986 – Ismail al-Faruqi, Palestinian-American philosopher and academic (b. 1921)
  1986   – Ajoy Mukherjee, Indian politician, Chief Minister of West Bengal (b. 1901)
  1986   – Giorgos Tzifos, Greek actor and cinematographer (b. 1918)
1987 – John Howard Northrop, American biochemist and academic, Nobel Prize laureate (b. 1891)
1988 – Hjördis Petterson, Swedish actress (b. 1908) 
  1988   – Ernst Ruska, German physicist and academic, Nobel Prize laureate (b. 1906)
1989 – Arseny Tarkovsky, Russian poet and translator (b. 1907)
1990 – Robert B. Meyner, American lawyer and politician, 44th Governor of New Jersey (b. 1908)
1991 – Leopold Nowak, Austrian musicologist and theorist (b. 1904)
1992 – Uncle Charlie Osborne, American fiddler (b. 1890)
1998 – Minoo Masani, Indian lawyer and politician (b. 1905)
2000 – Kazimierz Leski, Polish engineer and pilot (b. 1912)
  2000   – Murray MacLehose, Baron MacLehose of Beoch, Scottish politician and diplomat, 25th Governor of Hong Kong (b. 1917)
  2000   – Maurice Richard, Canadian ice hockey player and coach (b. 1921)
2002 – Marjorie Ogilvie Anderson, Scottish historian (b. 1909)
2003 – Luciano Berio, Italian composer and educator (b. 1925)
2006 – Rob Borsellino, American journalist (b. 1949)
  2006   – Paul Gleason, American actor (b. 1939)
  2006   – Craig Heyward, American football player (b. 1966)
2007 – Izumi Sakai, Japanese singer-songwriter (b. 1967)
  2007   – Gretchen Wyler, American actress and dancer (b. 1932)
  2007   – Ed Yost, American inventor, created the hot air balloon (b. 1919)
2008 – Franz Künstler, Hungarian soldier (b. 1900)
2009 – Thomas M. Franck, American lawyer and academic (b. 1931)
  2009   – Clive Granger, Welsh-American economist and academic, Nobel Prize laureate (b. 1934)
  2009   – Mona Grey, British nursing administrator; Northern Ireland's first Chief Nursing Officer 
  2009   – Abram Hoffer, Canadian biochemist, physician, and psychiatrist (b. 1917)
  2009   – Gérard Jean-Juste, Haitian-American priest and theologian (b. 1946)
  2009   – Carol Anne O'Marie, American nun and author (b. 1933)
  2009   – William Refshauge, Australian soldier and physician (b. 1913)
  2009   – Paul Sharratt, English-American television host (b. 1933)
2010 – Payut Ngaokrachang, Thai animator and director (b. 1929)
2011 – Jeff Conaway, American actor and singer (b. 1950)
  2011   – Margo Dydek, Polish-American basketball player (b. 1974)
  2011   – Gil Scott-Heron, American singer-songwriter and poet (b. 1949)
2012 – Simeon Daniel, Nevisian educator and politician, 1st Premier of Nevis (b. 1934)
  2012   – Friedrich Hirzebruch, German mathematician and academic (b. 1927)
  2012   – Anahit Perikhanian, Russian-born Armenian Iranologist (b. 1928)
  2012   – David Rimoin, Canadian-American geneticist and academic (b. 1936)
2013 – Jagjit Singh Lyallpuri, Indian politician (b. 1917)
  2013   – Bill Pertwee, English actor (b. 1926)
  2013   – Abdoulaye Sékou Sow, Malian politician, Prime Minister of Mali (b. 1931)
2014 – Robert Genn, Canadian painter and author (b. 1936)
  2014   – Helma Sanders-Brahms, German director, producer, and screenwriter (b. 1940)
  2014   – Roberto Vargas, Puerto Rican-American baseball player, coach, and manager (b. 1929)
  2014   – Massimo Vignelli, Italian-American graphic designer (b. 1931)
2015 – Erik Carlsson, Swedish rally driver (b. 1929)
  2015   – Nils Christie, Norwegian sociologist, criminologist, and author (b. 1928)
  2015   – Andy King, English footballer and manager (b. 1956)
  2015   – Michael Martin, American philosopher and academic (b. 1932)
2017 – Gregg Allman, American musician, singer and songwriter (b. 1947)
2018 – Gardner Dozois, American science fiction author and editor (b. 1947)
2020 – Larry Kramer, American playwright, public health advocate and LGBT rights activist (b. 1935)
2021 – Poul Schlüter, former Prime Minister of Denmark (b. 1929)

Holidays and observances
 Armed Forces Day (Nicaragua)
 Children's Day (Nigeria)
 Christian feast day: 
 Augustine of Canterbury
 Blessed Lojze Grozde
 Bruno of Würzburg
 Eutropius of Orange
 Hildebert
 Julius the Veteran
 May 27 (Eastern Orthodox liturgics)
 Mother's Day (Bolivia)
 Navy Day (Japan)
 Slavery Abolition Day (Guadeloupe, Saint Barthélemy, Saint Martin)
 Start of National Reconciliation Week (Australia)

References

External links

 BBC: On This Day
 
 Historical Events on May 27

Days of the year
May